The Treaty of Ghilajharighat, Tipam,  was signed between the Ahoms and the Mughal forces led by Mir Jumla II on January 23, 1663 or 9th Magh, 1584 saka.  The treaty Mir Jumla II brought occupation of the Ahom capital, Garhgaon, to an end.

Terms
The conditions of the treaty were as follows:

 Jayadhwaj Singha was to send a daughter to the Imperial harem.
 Twenty thousand tolas of gold, six times this quantity of silver and forty elephants to be made over at once.
 Three hundred thousand tolas of silver and ninety elephants to be supplied within twelve months.
 Six sons of the chief nobles to be made over as hostages pending compliance with the last mentioned condition.
 Twenty elephants to be supplied annually.
 The country west of the Bhareli river on the north bank of the Brahmaputra and of the Kalang river on the south to be ceded to the Emperor of Delhi.
 All prisoners and the family of the Baduli Phukan to be given up.

See also
List of treaties

Notes and references

 Gait, Edward A. A History of Assam. Calcutta, 1906.

1663 in India
1663 treaties
17th century in the Ahom kingdom
Treaties of India
G
1663 in the Mughal Empire